Urbas is a surname of primarily Eastern European extraction. The Polish-language form is derived from the diminutive of the given name Urban. Notable people with this surname include:

Marcin Urbaś (born 1976), a former Polish track and field athlete
Mandi Urbas (born 1982), a former professional footballer with dual German and American nationality
Gregor Urbas (born 1982), a Slovenian former competitive figure skater
Jan Urbas (born 1989), a Slovenian professional ice hockey player
Anna Margaret Urbas (died 1930), a Manhattan murder victim

References

Polish-language surnames